Peter Bohren (June 20, 1822 – July 4, 1882) was a Swiss mountain guide from Grindelwald.

Peter Bohren made three first ascents in the Bernese Alps. The group started at 3:30 a.m. at the Hotel Wengernalp and the mountaineers reached the summit of the Eiger in the fog at 12 noon.

The following year, he reached the Aletschhorn (4193 m) with two colleagues and a guest on June 18, 1859. His last first ascent was the Äbeni Flue (3962 m) together with a colleague and a guest via today's normal route (southwest flank and southeast ridge) on August 27, 1868.

Further reading
Alpine Club archive – bound Fuhrerbucher
Observations on some early ascents of the Wetterhorn

References

1822 births
1882 deaths
Alpine guides
Swiss mountain climbers
People from Grindelwald